The 2012–13 FA Cup was the 132nd season of the FA Cup, the main domestic cup competition in English football, and the oldest football knock-out competition in the world. It was sponsored by Budweiser for a second consecutive season, thus the competition name was The FA Cup with Budweiser.

A total of 833 clubs applied to enter, with 758 clubs being accepted into the competition.
The preliminary rounds commenced on 11 August 2012, with the first round proper played on 3 November 2012. The final was played on 11 May 2013 at Wembley Stadium in London between Manchester City and Wigan Athletic, with Wigan Athletic winning 1–0.

As a result, Wigan Athletic participated in the group stage of the following season's UEFA Europa League. Chelsea were the defending champions, having beaten Liverpool 2–1 in last season's final, but were eliminated in the semi-finals by Manchester City.

Three days after winning the cup, Wigan made history by becoming the first side to win the cup and get relegated in the same season, after they lost 4–1 to Arsenal, which sealed their relegation to the Football League Championship.

Teams

Schedule 
The schedule for the 2012–13 FA Cup, as announced by the Football Association, is as follows:

Qualifying rounds 

All of the teams entering the competition that are not members of either the Premier League or the Football League had to compete in the qualifying rounds to win a place in the competition proper.

First round proper
Teams from League One and League Two entered at this stage, along with the winners from the Fourth Round Qualifying.

The draw was made on 21 October 2012 with ties to be played on 2–4 November 2012. Yate Town and Slough Town were the lowest-ranked teams left in the competition, both competing in level 8 of the English football league system.

Second round proper
The draw for this round was made on 4 November 2012 with the ties played on the weekend of 1–2 December 2012.

Hastings United, from the seventh tier of English football, were the lowest-ranked team in the second round proper.

Bradford City were disqualified from this season's competition for fielding Curtis Good, who was ineligible to play, in a 1–1 draw against Brentford. As a result, it was presumed that Brentford won by walkover, but Bradford eventually made a successful appeal to the FA against expulsion and were reinstated and fined £1,000 instead allowing a replay to go ahead. Brentford would eventually dump Bradford City out of the cup after winning that replay.

Third round proper
Teams from the Premier League and Football League Championship entered at this stage, along with the winners from the second round.

The draw for the third round was made on 2 December 2012, with the ties played on the weekend of 5–6 January 2013.

Luton Town's Alex Lawless won the player of the round award. The results were as follows:
Alex Lawless, Luton Town
Danny Hylton, Aldershot Town
Matthew Barnes-Homer, Macclesfield Town
Liam Bridcutt, Brighton & Hove Albion
Andrea Orlandi, Brighton & Hove Albion

Hastings United remained the lowest-ranked football team in the third round proper, competing in level 7 of the English football league system.

Fourth round proper
The draw for the fourth round took place on 6 January 2013, with Macclesfield Town and Luton Town, both from the Conference National (5) remaining as the lowest-placed teams still in the competition.

Fifth round proper
The draw for the fifth round took place on 27 January 2013, with Luton Town from the Conference National (5) remaining as the lowest-ranked team still in the Cup.

Sixth round proper
The draw for the quarter-finals took place on 17 February 2013, with Barnsley, Millwall and Blackburn Rovers all from the Championship remaining as the lowest-ranked teams.

Semi-finals
The draw for the semi-finals took place on 10 March 2013, with Millwall from the Championship (2) remaining as the lowest-placed team still in the Cup. The draw was carried out by Edgar Davids and Graeme Le Saux at Wembley Stadium in London.

Final

Prior to kick off as Manchester City had already qualified for the 2013–14 UEFA Champions League, therefore Wigan Athletic had already secured a place in 2013–14 UEFA Europa League, regardless of whether they won or lost.

Top scorers

Broadcasting rights
The domestic broadcasting rights for the competition were held by the free-to-air channel ITV and the subscription channel ESPN. ITV has held the rights since 2007–08, while ESPN gained FA Cup coverage from the 2010–11 season following the collapse of Setanta in the UK. Under the Ofcom code of protected sporting events, the FA Cup Final must be broadcast live on UK terrestrial television.

These matches were broadcast live on UK television:

1ITV unless stated otherwise
2Braintree Town vs. Tranmere Rovers was originally scheduled to be on ITV but because the game was postponed it was moved to ITV4

References

External links
 The FA Cup at thefa.com

 
2012-13
2012–13 domestic association football cups
FA Cup